Harold Carr may refer to:

Harold Herbert Carr, New Zealand land court judge and administrator
Harold Norman Carr, politician in Ontario, Canada
Bugatti Type 57S Atalante (57502)#Harold Carr
Harold Carr (songwriter), see 1957 in music

See also
Harry Carr (disambiguation)